Olof Sterner (1914 – 30 September 1968) was a Swedish chess player, Nordic Chess Championship winner (1957).

Biography
Olof Sterner was one of the strongest chess players in Sweden in the 1950s. His main sporting achievement is the victory in the Nordic Chess Championship in 1957, which took place in the Helsinki. In 1963, he participated in Stockholm International Chess Tournament. Participant of major International Chess Tournaments in Dresden (1956) and Hastings (1957/1958).

Olof Sterner played for Sweden in the Chess Olympiad:
 In 1958, at third board in the 13th Chess Olympiad in Munich (+4, =6, -4).

Olof Sterner played for Sweden in the European Team Chess Championship preliminaries:
 In 1961, at sixth board in the 2nd European Team Chess Championship preliminaries (+0, =2, -1).

References

External links

Olof Sterner chess games at 365chess.com

1914 births
1968 deaths
Sportspeople from Norrköping
Swedish chess players
Chess Olympiad competitors
20th-century chess players